On 11 March 2014, 15 Indian security personnel and one civilian were shot dead in an attack engineered by Naxals.

Incident
The Central Reserve Police Force and police were traveling from the village of Tongpal to Jeeram Ghati. According to The Hindu, "The team was engaged in an area domination exercise to sanitise the area for troop movements and also to provide security to road construction workers." While traveling, one hundred men surrounded them and began opening fire, killing 15 security personnel and one civilian, and injuring three. The shooting lasted under 15 minutes and after the rebels were able to loot weapons, equipment and ammunition from the wounded and dead. Local police had sounded the alarm about Maoist activity in the region but the security operation was not cancelled.

References

Mass murder in 2014
Crime in Chhattisgarh
Naxalite–Maoist insurgency
Mass shootings in India
Terrorist incidents in India in 2014
2014 mass shootings in Asia
2014 murders in India